

Events

Pre-1600
36 – Forces of Emperor Guangwu of the Eastern Han, under the command of Wu Han, conquer the separatist Chengjia empire, reuniting China.
 274 – A temple to Sol Invictus is dedicated in Rome by Emperor Aurelian.
 333 – Roman Emperor Constantine the Great elevates his youngest son Constans to the rank of Caesar.
 336 – First documentary sign of Christmas celebration in Rome.
 350 – Vetranio meets Constantius II at Naissus (Serbia) and is forced to abdicate his imperial title. Constantius allows him to live as a private citizen on a state pension.
 508 – Clovis I, king of the Franks, is baptized into the Catholic faith at Reims, by Saint Remigius.
 597 – Augustine of Canterbury and his fellow-labourers baptise in Kent more than 10,000 Anglo-Saxons.
 800 – The coronation of Charlemagne as Holy Roman Emperor, in Rome.
 820 – Eastern Emperor Leo V is murdered in a church of the Great Palace of Constantinople by followers of Michael II.  
1000 – The foundation of the Kingdom of Hungary: Hungary is established as a Christian kingdom by Stephen I of Hungary.
1013 – Sweyn Forkbeard takes control of the Danelaw and is proclaimed king of England.
1025 – Coronation of Mieszko II Lambert as king of Poland.
1046 – Henry III is crowned Holy Roman Emperor by Pope Clement II.
1066 – William the Conqueror, Duke of Normandy is crowned king of England, at Westminster Abbey, London.
1076 – Coronation of Bolesław II the Generous as king of Poland.
1100 – Baldwin of Boulogne is crowned the first King of Jerusalem in the Church of the Nativity in Bethlehem.
1130 – Count Roger II of Sicily is crowned the first king of Sicily.
1261 – Eleven-year-old John IV Laskaris of the restored Eastern Roman Empire is deposed and blinded by orders of his co-ruler Michael VIII Palaiologos.
1492 – The carrack Santa María, commanded by Christopher Columbus, runs onto a reef off Haiti due to an improper watch.
1553 – Battle of Tucapel: Mapuche rebels under Lautaro defeat the Spanish conquistadors and executes the governor of Chile, Pedro de Valdivia.
1559 – Pope Pius IV is elected, four months after his predecessor's death.

1601–1900
1758 – Halley's Comet is sighted by Johann Georg Palitzsch, confirming Edmund Halley's prediction of its passage.  This was the first passage of a comet predicted ahead of time.
1766 – Mapuches in Chile launch a series of surprise attacks against the Spanish starting the Mapuche uprising of 1766.
1776 – George Washington and the Continental Army cross the Delaware River at night to attack Hessian forces serving Great Britain at Trenton, New Jersey, the next day.
1793 – General "Mad Anthony" Wayne and a 300 man detachment identify the site of St. Clair's 1791 defeat by the large number of unburied human remains at modern Fort Recovery, Ohio.
1809 – Dr. Ephraim McDowell performs the first ovariotomy, removing a 22-pound tumor.
1814 – Rev. Samuel Marsden holds the first Christian service on land in New Zealand at Rangihoua Bay.
1815 – The Handel and Haydn Society, oldest continually performing arts organization in the United States, gives its first performance.
1826 – The Eggnog Riot at the United States Military Academy concludes after beginning the previous evening.
1831 – The Great Jamaican Slave Revolt begins; up to 20% of Jamaica's slaves mobilize in an ultimately unsuccessful fight for freedom.
1837 – Second Seminole War: American general Zachary Taylor leads 1,100 troops against the Seminoles at the Battle of Lake Okeechobee.
1868 – Pardons for ex-Confederates: United States President Andrew Johnson grants an unconditional pardon to all Confederate veterans.

1901–present
1914 – A series of unofficial truces occur across the Western Front to celebrate Christmas.
1915 – The National Protection War breaks out against the Empire of China, as military leaders Cai E and Tang Jiyao proclaim the independence of Yunnan and begin a campaign to restore the Republic.
1927 – B. R. Ambedkar and his followers burn copies of the Manusmriti in Mahad, Maharashtra, to protest its treatment of Dalit people.
1932 – A magnitude 7.6 earthquake in Gansu, China kills 275 people.
1941 – Admiral Chester W. Nimitz, appointed commander of the U.S. Pacific Fleet on December 17, arrives at Pearl Harbor.
  1941   – World War II: Battle of Hong Kong ends, beginning the Japanese occupation of Hong Kong.
  1941   – Admiral Émile Muselier seizes the archipelago of Saint Pierre and Miquelon, which become the first part of France to be liberated by the Free French Forces.
1946 – The first European self-sustaining nuclear chain reaction is initiated within the Soviet Union's F-1 nuclear reactor.
1950 – The Stone of Scone, traditional coronation stone of British monarchs, is taken from Westminster Abbey by Scottish nationalist students. It later turns up in Scotland on April 11, 1951.
1951 – A bomb explodes at the home of Harry T. Moore and Harriette V. S. Moore, early leaders of the Civil Rights Movement, killing Harry instantly and fatally wounding Harriette.
1962 – The Soviet Union conducts its final above-ground nuclear weapon test, in anticipation of the 1963 Partial Nuclear Test Ban Treaty.
1963 – Turkish Cypriot Bayrak Radio begins transmitting in Cyprus after Turkish Cypriots are forcibly excluded from Cyprus Broadcasting Corporation.
1968 – Apollo program: Apollo 8 performs the first successful Trans-Earth injection (TEI) maneuver, sending the crew and spacecraft on a trajectory back to Earth from Lunar orbit.
  1968   – Kilvenmani massacre: Forty-four Dalits (untouchables) are burnt to death in Kizhavenmani village, Tamil Nadu, a retaliation for a campaign for higher wages by Dalit laborers.
1976 – EgyptAir Flight 664, a Boeing 707-366C, crashes on approach to Don Mueang International Airport, killing 71 people.
1977 – Israeli Prime Minister Menachem Begin meets in Egypt with its president Anwar Sadat.
1986 – Iraqi Airways Flight 163, a Boeing 737-270C, is hijacked and crashes in Arar, Saudi Arabia, killing 63 people.
1989 – Romanian Revolution: Deposed President of Romania Nicolae Ceaușescu and his wife, Elena, are condemned to death and executed after a summary trial.
1991 – Mikhail Gorbachev resigns as President of the Soviet Union (the union itself is dissolved the next day). Ukraine's referendum is finalized and Ukraine officially leaves the Soviet Union.
1999 – Cubana de Aviación Flight 310, a Yakovlev Yak-42, crashes near Bejuma, Carabobo State, Venezuela, killing 22 people.
2003 – UTA Flight 141, a Boeing 727-223, crashes at the Cotonou Airport in Benin, killing 141 people.
  2003   – The ill-fated Beagle 2 probe, released from the Mars Express spacecraft on December 19, stops transmitting shortly before its scheduled landing.
2004 – The Cassini orbiter releases Huygens probe which successfully landed on Saturn's moon Titan on January 14, 2005.
2012 – An Antonov An-72 plane crashes close to the city of Shymkent, killing 27 people. 
  2012   – Air Bagan Flight 011, a Fokker 100, crashes on approach to Heho Airport in Heho, Myanmar, killing two people. 
2016 – A Russian Defence Ministry Tupolev Tu-154 carrying members of the Alexandrov Ensemble crashes into the Black Sea shortly after takeoff, killing all 92 people on board.
2019 – Twenty people are killed and thousands are left homeless by Typhoon Phanfone in the Philippines.
2020 – An explosion in Nashville, Tennessee occurs, leaving three civilians in the hospital.
2021 – The James Webb Space Telescope is launched.

Births

Pre-1600
1250 – John IV Laskaris, Byzantine emperor (d. 1305)
1281 – Alice de Lacy, 4th Countess of Lincoln (d. 1348)
1400 – John Sutton, 1st Baron Dudley, Lord Lieutenant of Ireland (d. 1487)
1424 – Margaret Stewart, Dauphine of France (d. 1445)
1461 – Christina of Saxony, Queen consort of Denmark (d. 1521)
1490 – Francesco Marinoni, Italian Roman Catholic priest (d. 1562)
1493 – Antoinette de Bourbon, French noblewoman (d. 1583)
1505 – Christine of Saxony, German noblewoman (d. 1549)
1564 – Johannes Buxtorf, German Calvinist theologian (d. 1629)
1583 – Orlando Gibbons, English organist and composer (d. 1625)
1584 – Margaret of Austria, Queen of Spain (d. 1611)

1601–1900
1601 – Ernest I, Duke of Saxe-Gotha (d. 1675)
1628 – Noël Coypel, French painter and educator (d. 1707)
1642 (OS) – Isaac Newton, English physicist and mathematician (d. 1726/1727)
1652 – Archibald Pitcairne, Scottish physician, anatomist, and scholar (d. 1713)
1665 – Lady Grizel Baillie, Scottish-English poet and songwriter (d. 1746)
1674 – Thomas Halyburton, Scottish minister and theologian (d. 1712)
1686 – Giovanni Battista Somis, Italian violinist and composer (d. 1763)
1700 – Leopold II, Prince of Anhalt-Dessau (d. 1758)
1711 – Jean-Joseph de Mondonville, French violinist and composer (d. 1772)
1716 – Johann Jakob Reiske, German physician and scholar (d. 1774)
1717 – Pope Pius VI (d. 1799)
1728 – Johann Adam Hiller, German composer and conductor (d. 1804)
1730 – Philip Mazzei, Italian-American physician and philosopher (d. 1816)
1745 – Chevalier de Saint-Georges, Caribbean-French violinist, composer, and conductor (d. 1799)
1757 – Benjamin Pierce, American general and politician, 17th Governor of New Hampshire (d. 1839)
1766 – Christmas Evans, Welsh Nonconformist preacher (d. 1838)
1771 – Dorothy Wordsworth, English diarist and poet (d. 1855)
1776 – Sydney, Lady Morgan, Irish author and poet (d. 1859)
1810 – L. L. Langstroth, American apiarist, clergyman and teacher (d. 1895) 
1821 – Clara Barton, American nurse and humanitarian, founder of the American Red Cross (d. 1912)
1825 – Stephen F. Chadwick, American lawyer and politician, 5th Governor of Oregon (d. 1895)
1829 – Patrick Gilmore, Irish-American composer and bandleader (d. 1892)
1856 – Pud Galvin, American baseball player and manager (d. 1902)
1861 – Madan Mohan Malaviya, Indian educator, lawyer, and politician, President of the Indian National Congress (d. 1946)
1865 – Evangeline Booth, English 4th General of The Salvation Army (d. 1950)
1869 – Charles Finger, English-American journalist and author (d. 1941)
1872 – Helena Rubinstein, Polish-American businesswoman and philanthropist (d. 1965)
1873 – Otto Frederick Hunziker, Swiss-American agriculturalist and educator (d. 1959)
1874 – Lina Cavalieri, Italian soprano and actress (d. 1944)
1875 – Francis Aveling, Canadian psychologist and priest (d. 1941)
  1875   – Theodor Innitzer, Austrian cardinal (d. 1955)
1876 – Muhammad Ali Jinnah, Indian-Pakistani lawyer and politician, 1st Governor-General of Pakistan (d. 1948)
  1876   – Adolf Otto Reinhold Windaus, German chemist and academic, Nobel Prize laureate (d. 1959)
1878 – Louis Chevrolet, Swiss-American race car driver and businessman, co-founded Chevrolet (d. 1941)
  1878   – Noël, Countess of Rothes, philanthropist, social leader and heroine of Titanic disaster (d. 1956)
  1878   – Joseph M. Schenck, Russian-American film producer (d. 1961)
1883 – Hugo Bergmann, Czech-Israeli philosopher and academic (d. 1975)
  1883   – Hana Meisel, Belarusian-Israeli agronomist and politician (d. 1972)
1884 – Samuel Berger, American boxer (d. 1925)
  1884   – Evelyn Nesbit, American model and actress (d. 1967)
1886 – Malak Hifni Nasif, Egyptian poet and activist (d. 1918)
  1886   – Kid Ory, American trombonist and bandleader (d. 1973)
1887 – Conrad Hilton, American entrepreneur (d. 1979)
1889 – Lila Bell Wallace, American publisher and philanthropist, co-founded Reader's Digest (d. 1984)
1890 – Noel Odell, English geologist and mountaineer (d. 1987)
1891 – Kenneth Anderson, Indian-English general and politician, Governor of Gibraltar (d. 1959)
  1891   – Clarrie Grimmett, New Zealand-Australian cricketer (d. 1980)
1899 – Humphrey Bogart, American actor (d. 1957)

1901–present
1901 – Princess Alice, Duchess of Gloucester (d. 2004)
1902 – Barton MacLane, American actor, playwright, and screenwriter (d. 1969)
  1902   – William Bell, American tuba player and educator (d. 1971)
1903 – Antiochos Evangelatos, Greek composer and conductor (d. 1981)
1904 – Gerhard Herzberg, German-Canadian physicist and chemist, Nobel Prize laureate (d. 1999)
1906 – Lew Grade, Baron Grade, Ukrainian-English film producer (d. 1998)
  1906   – Ernst Ruska, German physicist and academic, Nobel Prize laureate (d. 1988)
1907 – Cab Calloway, American singer-songwriter and bandleader (d. 1994)
  1907   – Mike Mazurki, Ukrainian-American wrestler and actor (d. 1990)
  1907   – Glenn McCarthy, American businessman, founded the Shamrock Hotel (d. 1988)
1908 – Quentin Crisp, English author and illustrator (d. 1999)
  1908   – Ernest L. Massad, American general (d. 1993)
  1908   – Jo-Jo Moore, American baseball player (d. 2001)
1909 – Zora Arkus-Duntov, Belgian-American engineer (d. 1996)
1911 – Louise Bourgeois, French-American sculptor and painter (d. 2010)
1913 – Candy Candido, American singer, bass player, and voice actor (d. 1999)
  1913   – Tony Martin, American singer (d. 2012)
1914 – James Fletcher Jnr, New Zealand businessman (d. 2007)
  1914   – Oscar Lewis, American anthropologist of Latin America (d. 1970)
1915 – Pete Rugolo, Italian-American composer and producer (d. 2011)
1916 – Ahmed Ben Bella, Algerian soldier and politician, 1st President of Algeria (d. 2012)
1917 – Arseny Mironov, Russian scientist, engineer, pilot, oldest active researcher in aircraft aerodynamics and flight testing (d. 2019)
  1917   – Lincoln Verduga Loor, Ecuadorian journalist and politician (d. 2009)
1918 – Anwar Sadat, Egyptian lieutenant and politician, 3rd President of Egypt, Nobel Prize laureate (d. 1981)
1919 – Naushad Ali, Indian composer and director (d. 2006)
  1919   – Paul David, Canadian cardiologist and politician, founded the Montreal Heart Institute (d. 1999)
1921 – Zaib-un-Nissa Hamidullah, Indian-Pakistani journalist and author (d. 2000)
  1921   – Steve Otto, Polish-Canadian lawyer and politician (d. 1989)
1922 – William Demby, American author (d. 2013)
1923 – René Girard, French-American historian, philosopher, and critic (d. 2015)
  1923   – Louis Lane, American conductor and educator (d. 2016)
1924 – Rod Serling, American screenwriter and producer, created The Twilight Zone (d. 1975)
  1924   – Atal Bihari Vajpayee, Indian poet and politician, 10th Prime Minister of India (d. 2018)
1925 – Carlos Castaneda, Peruvian-American anthropologist and author (d. 1998)
  1925   – Ned Garver, American baseball player (d. 2017)
  1925   – Sam Pollock, Canadian businessman (d. 2007)
1926 – Enrique Jorrín, Cuban violinist and composer (d. 1987)
1927 – Nellie Fox, American baseball player and coach (d. 1975)
  1927   – Leo Kubiak, American basketball and baseball player
  1927   – Ram Narayan, Indian sarangi player
1928 – Irish McCalla, American actress and model (d. 2002)
  1928   – Dick Miller, American actor, director, and screenwriter (d. 2019)
1929 – Christine M. Jones, American educator and politician (d. 2013)
  1929   – China Machado, Chinese-born Portuguese-American fashion model, editor and television producer (d. 2016)
1930 – Emmanuel Agassi, Iranian-American boxer and coach
  1930   – Armenak Alachachian, Armenian basketball player and coach (d. 2017)
  1930   – Mary Rose Tuitt, Montserrat politician (d. 2005)
1932 – Mabel King, American actress and singer (d. 1999)
1933 – Basil Heatley, English runner (d. 2019)
1935 – Sadiq al-Mahdi, Sudanese politician, Prime Minister of Sudan (d. 2020)
  1935   – Stephen Barnett, American scholar and academic (d. 2009)
  1935   – Jeanne Hopkins Lucas, American educator and politician (d. 2007)
1936 – Princess Alexandra, The Honourable Lady Ogilvy
  1936   – Ismail Merchant, Indian-English director and producer (d. 2005)
1937 – Maung Aye, Burmese military officer
1937 – O'Kelly Isley Jr., American R&B/soul singer-songwriter (d. 1986) 
1938 – Duane Armstrong, American painter
  1938   – Noel Picard, Canadian ice hockey player (d. 2017)
1939 – Ghulam Ahmad Bilour, Pakistani businessman and politician
  1939   – Bob James, American keyboard player, songwriter, and producer 
  1939   – Akong Rinpoche, Tibetan-Chinese spiritual leader (d. 2013)
1940 – Hilary Spurling, English journalist and author
1941 – Kenneth Calman, Scottish physician and academic
1942 – Françoise Dürr, French tennis player and coach
  1942   – Barbara Follett, English politician
  1942   – Barry Goldberg, American keyboard player, songwriter, and producer 
  1942   – Enrique Morente, Spanish singer-songwriter (d. 2010)
1943 – Wilson Fittipaldi Júnior, Brazilian race car driver and businessman
  1943   – Ravish Malhotra, Indian pilot and military officer
  1943   – Hanna Schygulla, German actress
1944 – Kenny Everett, British comedian and broadcaster (d. 1995)
  1944   – Jairzinho, Brazilian footballer
  1944   – Sam Strahan, New Zealand rugby player (d. 2019)
1945 – Rick Berman, American screenwriter and producer
  1945   – Eve Pollard, English journalist and author
  1945   – Mike Pringle, Zambian-Scottish lawyer and politician
  1945   – Noel Redding, English singer-songwriter and bass player (d. 2003)
  1945   – Ken Stabler, American football player and sportscaster (d. 2015)
1946 – Jimmy Buffett, American singer-songwriter, guitarist, producer, and actor
  1946   – Larry Csonka, American football player and sportscaster
  1946   – Christopher Frayling, English author and academic
  1946   – Gene Lamont, American baseball player and manager
1948 – Merry Clayton, American singer and actress
  1948   – Kay Hymowitz, American sociologist and writer
  1948   – Barbara Mandrell, American singer-songwriter and actress
  1948   – Joel Santana, Brazilian footballer and manager
1949 – Simone Bittencourt de Oliveira, Brazilian singer
  1949   – Nawaz Sharif, Pakistani politician, 12th Prime Minister of Pakistan
  1949   – Sissy Spacek, American actress 
1950 – Peter Boardman, English mountaineer and author (d. 1982)
  1950   – Karl Rove, American political strategist and activist
  1950   – Manny Trillo, Venezuelan baseball player and manager
1952 – Tolossa Kotu, Ethiopian runner and coach
  1952   – CCH Pounder, Guyanese-American actress
1953 – Kaarlo Maaninka, Finnish runner
1954 – Annie Lennox, Scottish singer-songwriter and pianist
1957 – Mansoor Akhtar, Pakistani cricketer 
  1957   – Chris Kamara, English footballer and sportscaster
  1957   – Shane MacGowan, English-Irish singer-songwriter 
1958 – Cheryl Chase, American voice actress and singer
  1958   – Hanford Dixon, American football player, coach, and sportscaster
  1958   – Rickey Henderson, American baseball player and coach
  1958   – Konstantin Kinchev, Russian singer-songwriter and guitarist 
  1958   – Alannah Myles, Canadian singer-songwriter and actress
1959 – Michael P. Anderson, American colonel, pilot, and astronaut (d. 2003)
  1959   – Ramdas Athawale, Indian poet and politician
1961 – Íngrid Betancourt, Colombian political scientist and politician
1962 – Francis Dunnery, English musician
1964 – Ian Bostridge, English tenor
  1964   – Gary McAllister, Scottish footballer and manager
  1964   – Kevin Simms, English rugby player
  1964   – Bob Stanley, English keyboard player, songwriter, producer, and journalist 
1965 – Ed Davey, English politician, Leader of the Liberal Democrats
  1965   – David Rath, Czech physician and politician
1966 – Toshi Arai, Japanese race car driver
1967 – Jason Thirsk, American bass player (d. 1996)
1968 – Helena Christensen, Danish model and actress
  1968   – Jim Dowd, American ice hockey player
1969 – Nicolas Godin, French musician
  1969   – Noel Goldthorpe, Australian rugby league player
  1969   – Frederick Onyancha, Kenyan runner
1970 – Emmanuel Amunike, Nigerian footballer and manager
  1970   – Rodney Dent, American basketball player
1971 – Dido, English singer-songwriter
  1971   – Justin Trudeau, Canadian educator and politician, 23rd Prime Minister of Canada
1972 – Mac Powell, American singer-songwriter and producer 
  1972   – Qu Yunxia, Chinese runner
1973 – Robbie Elliott, English footballer and coach
  1973   – Chris Harris, American wrestler
  1973   – Daisuke Miura, Japanese baseball player and coach
  1973   – Alexandre Trudeau, Canadian journalist and director
1975 – Daniel Mustard, American singer-songwriter
  1975   – Hideki Okajima, Japanese baseball player
  1975   – Choi Sung-yong, South Korean footballer and manager
  1975   – Marcus Trescothick, English cricketer
1976 – Tuomas Holopainen, Finnish keyboard player, songwriter, and producer 
  1976   – Tim James, American basketball player and coach
  1976   – Atko Väikmeri, Estonian footballer
  1976   – Armin van Buuren, Dutch DJ and record producer
1977 – Israel Vázquez, Mexican boxer
  1977   – Ali Tandoğan, Turkish footballer
1978 – Simon Jones, Welsh cricketer
  1978   – Joel Porter, Australian footballer and manager
  1978   – Jeremy Strong, American actor
1979 – Ferman Akgül, Turkish singer-songwriter 
  1979   – Laurent Bonnart, French footballer
  1979   – Robert Huff, English race car driver
  1979   – Hyun Young-min, South Korean footballer
1980 – Marcus Trufant, American football player
  1980   – Laura Sadler, English actress (d. 2003)
1981 – Trenesha Biggers, American wrestler and model
  1981   – Christian Holst, Danish-Faroese footballer
  1981   – Willy Taveras, Dominican baseball player
1982 – Shawn Andrews, American football player
  1982   – Rob Edwards, Welsh footballer
  1982   – Ethan Kath, Canadian keyboard player, songwriter and producer 
  1982   – Chris Rene, American singer-songwriter and producer
1984 – Chris Cahill, Samoan footballer
  1984   – Alastair Cook, English cricketer
  1984   – Jessica Origliasso, Australian singer, actress, and fashion designer
  1984   – Lisa Origliasso, Australian singer, actress, and fashion designer
  1984   – Chris Richard, American basketball player
1985 – Martin Mathathi, Kenyan runner
  1985   – Rusev, Bulgarian-American professional wrestler
1987 – Ceyhun Gülselam, Turkish footballer
  1987   – Demaryius Thomas, American football player (d. 2021)
1988 – Joãozinho, Brazilian footballer
  1988   – Eric Gordon, American basketball player
  1988   – Lukas Hinds-Johnson, German rugby player
1992 – Mitakeumi Hisashi, Japanese sumo wrestler
1993 – Emi Takei, Japanese actress, fashion model and singer

Deaths

Pre-1600
 304 – Saint Anastasia
 795 – Pope Adrian I
 820 – Emperor Leo V
 936 – Zhang Jingda, general of Later Tang
 940 – Makan ibn Kaki, Iranian general
1147 – Guy II, Count of Ponthieu (b. c. 1120)
1156 – Peter the Venerable, French abbot and saint (b. 1092)
  1156   – Sverker the Elder, king of Sweden
1294 – Mestwin II, Duke of Pomerania
1395 – Elisabeth, Countess of Neuchâtel, Swiss ruler
1406 – Henry III of Castile (b. 1379)
1505 – George Grey, 2nd Earl of Kent, English politician (b. 1454)
1553 – Pedro de Valdivia, Spanish explorer and politician, 1st Royal Governor of Chile (b. 1500)

1601–1900
1634 – Lettice Knollys, English noblewoman (b. 1540)
1635 – Samuel de Champlain, French soldier, geographer, and explorer (b. 1567)
1676 – William Cavendish, 1st Duke of Newcastle, English soldier and politician, Lord Lieutenant of Nottinghamshire (b. 1592)
  1676   – Matthew Hale, English lawyer and jurist, Lord Chief Justice of England and Wales (b. 1609)
1683 – Kara Mustafa Pasha, Ottoman general and politician, 111th Grand Vizier of the Ottoman Empire (b. 1634)
1730 – Henry Scott, 1st Earl of Deloraine, Scottish peer and general (b. 1676)
1758 – James Hervey, English priest and author (b. 1714)
1784 – Yosa Buson, Japanese poet and painter (b. 1716)
1796 – Velu Nachiyar, Queen of Sivagangai (b. 1730)
1824 – Barbara von Krüdener, German mystic and author (b. 1764)
  1824   – William Lawless, Irish revolutionary, later French Army general (b. 1772)
1868 – Linus Yale, Jr., American engineer and businessman (b. 1821)
1875 – Young Tom Morris, Scottish golfer (b. 1851)
1880 – Fridolin Anderwert, Swiss lawyer and politician, President of the Swiss National Council (b. 1828)

1901–present
1916 – Albert Chmielowski, Polish saint, founded the Albertine Brothers (b. 1845)
1921 – Vladimir Korolenko, Russian journalist, author, and activist (b. 1853)
1925 – Karl Abraham, German psychoanalyst and author (b. 1877)
1926 – Emperor Taishō of Japan (b. 1879)
1928 – Miles Burke, American boxer (b. 1885)
1930 – Jakob Mändmets, Estonian journalist and author (b. 1871)
1933 – Francesc Macià, Catalan colonel and politician, 122nd President of Catalonia (b. 1859)
1935 – Paul Bourget, French author and critic (b. 1852)
1938 – Karel Čapek, Czech author and playwright (b. 1890)
1940 – Agnes Ayres, American actress (b. 1898)
1941 – Richard S. Aldrich, American lawyer and politician (b. 1884)
1944 – George Steer, South African-English journalist and author (b. 1909)
1946 – W. C. Fields, American actor, comedian, juggler, and screenwriter (b. 1880)
1947 – Gaspar G. Bacon, American lawyer and politician, 51st Lieutenant Governor of Massachusetts (b. 1886)
1949 – Leon Schlesinger, American animator and producer, founded Warner Bros. Cartoons (b. 1884)
1950 – Neil Francis Hawkins, English politician (b. 1903)
1952 – Margrethe Mather, American photographer (b. 1886)
1953 – Patsy Donovan, Irish-American baseball player and manager (b. 1865)
  1953   – William Haselden, British cartoonist (b. 1872)
1956 – Robert Walser, Swiss author and playwright (b. 1878)
1957 – Charles Pathé, French record producer, founded Pathé Records (b. 1863)
1961 – Owen Brewster, American captain, lawyer, and politician, 54th Governor of Maine (b. 1888)
  1961   – Otto Loewi, German-American pharmacologist and academic, Nobel Prize laureate (b. 1873)
1963 – Tristan Tzara, Romanian-French poet, playwright, painter, and critic (b. 1896)
1970 – Michael Peto, Hungarian-English photographer and journalist (b. 1908)
1973 – İsmet İnönü, Turkish general and politician, 2nd President of Turkey (b. 1884)
  1973   – Gabriel Voisin, French pilot and engineer (b. 1880)
1975 – Gaston Gallimard, French publisher, founded Éditions Gallimard (b. 1881)
  1975   – Gunnar Kangro, Estonian mathematician and author (b. 1913)
1977 – Charlie Chaplin, English actor and director (b. 1889)
1979 – Joan Blondell, American actress and singer (b. 1906)
  1979   – Jordi Bonet, Canadian painter and sculptor (b. 1932)
1980 – Fred Emney, English actor and comedian (b. 1900)
1983 – Joan Miró, Spanish painter and sculptor (b. 1893)
1988 – Shōhei Ōoka, Japanese author and critic (b. 1909)
  1988   – Edward Pelham-Clinton, 10th Duke of Newcastle, English entomologist and lepidopterist (b. 1920)
1989 – Benny Binion, American poker player and businessman (b. 1904)
  1989   – Elena Ceaușescu, Romanian politician, First Lady of Romania (b. 1916)
  1989   – Nicolae Ceaușescu, Romanian general and politician, 1st President of Romania (b. 1918)
  1989   – Betty Garde, American actress (b. 1905)
  1989   – Frederick F. Houser, American judge and politician, 34th Lieutenant Governor of California (b. 1905)
  1989   – Billy Martin, American baseball player and manager (b. 1928)
  1989   – Robert Pirosh, American director and screenwriter (b. 1910)
1991 – Wilbur Snyder, American football player and wrestler (b. 1929)
1992 – Monica Dickens, British-American nurse and author (b. 1915)
1993 – Pierre Victor Auger, French physicist and academic (b. 1899)
1994 – Zail Singh, Indian politician, 7th President of India (b. 1916)
1995 – Emmanuel Levinas, Lithuanian-French philosopher and academic (b. 1906)
  1995   – Dean Martin, American singer and actor (b. 1917)
  1995   – Chang Kee-ryo, Korean surgeon (b. 1914)
1996 – Bill Hewitt, Canadian sportscaster (b. 1928)
1997 – Anatoli Boukreev, Kazakh mountaineer and explorer (b. 1958)
  1997   – Denver Pyle, American actor (b. 1920)
  1998   – John Pulman, English snooker player (b. 1923)
2000 – Neil Hawke, Australian cricketer and footballer (b. 1939)
  2000   – Willard Van Orman Quine, American philosopher and academic (b. 1908)
2001 – Alfred A. Tomatis, French otolaryngologist and academic (b. 1920)
2003 – Nicholas Mavroules, American politician (b. 1929)
2004 – Gennadi Strekalov, Russian engineer and astronaut (b. 1940)
2005 – Derek Bailey, English guitarist (b. 1930)
  2005   – Robert Barbers, Filipino police officer, lawyer, and politician, 15th Secretary of the Interior and Local Government (b. 1944)
  2005   – Birgit Nilsson, Swedish operatic soprano (b. 1918)
  2005   – Joseph Pararajasingham, Sri Lankan journalist, businessman, and politician (b. 1934)
2006 – James Brown, American singer-songwriter (b. 1933)
2007 – Des Barrick, English cricketer (b. 1927)
  2007   – Jim Beauchamp, American baseball player and coach (b. 1939)
2008 – Eartha Kitt, American singer and actress (b. 1927)
2009 – Vic Chesnutt, American singer-songwriter and guitarist (b. 1964)
2010 – Carlos Andrés Pérez, Venezuelan politician, 66th President of Venezuela (b. 1922)
2011 – Giorgio Bocca, Italian journalist (b. 1920)
  2011   – Jim Sherwood, American saxophonist (b. 1942)
  2011   – Simms Taback, American author and illustrator (b. 1932)
2012 – Erico Aumentado, Filipino journalist, lawyer, and politician (b. 1940)
  2012   – Halfdan Hegtun, Norwegian radio host and politician (b. 1918)
  2012   – Joe Krivak, American football player and coach (b. 1935)
  2012   – Turki bin Sultan, Saudi Arabian politician (b. 1959)
  2012   – Şerafettin Elçi, Turkish lawyer, politician, government minister (b. 1938)
2013 – Anthony J. Bryant, American historian and author (b. 1961)
  2013   – David R. Harris, English geographer, anthropologist, archaeologist and academic (b. 1930)
  2013   – Wayne Harrison, English footballer (b. 1967)
  2013   – Mike Hegan, American baseball player and sportscaster (b. 1942)
  2013   – Lola Lange, Canadian rural feminist and appointee to the Royal Commission on the Status of Women (b. 1922)
  2013   – Mel Mathay, Filipino politician, 8th Mayor of Quezon City (b. 1932)
2014 – Ricardo Porro, Cuban-French architect (b. 1925)
  2014   – Geoff Pullar, English cricketer (b. 1935)
  2014   – David Ryall, English actor (b. 1935)
2015 – George Clayton Johnson, American author and screenwriter (b. 1929)
  2015   – Dorothy M. Murdock, American author and historian (b. 1961)
2016 – Valery Khalilov, Russian military musician and composer (b. 1952)
  2016   – George Michael, British singer and songwriter (b. 1963)
  2016   – Vera Rubin, American astronomer (b. 1928)
2017 – D. Herbert Lipson, American magazine publisher (Philadelphia, Boston) (b. 1929) 
2018 – Sulagitti Narasamma, Indian midwife (b. 1920)
2019 – Ari Behn, Norwegian writer (b. 1972)
2020 – K. C. Jones, American basketball player and coach (b. 1932)
2021 – Wayne Thiebaud, American artist (b. 1920)
2022 – Fabián O'Neill, Uruguayan footballer (b. 1973)

Holidays and observances
Children's Day (Cameroon, Central African Republic, Chad, Equatorial Guinea, Democratic Republic of the Congo, Gabon, Republic of Congo) 
Christian feast day:
Anastasia of Sirmium (Catholic Church)
Stephen (Armenian Apostolic Church)
December 25 (Eastern Orthodox liturgics)
Christmas Day, Christian festival commemorating the birth of Jesus. (Internationally observed)
Tulsi Pujan Diwas (India)
Constitution Day (Taiwan)
Good Governance Day (India)
Malkh-Festival (Nakh peoples of Chechnya and Ingushetia)
Quaid-e-Azam's Day (Pakistan)
Takanakuy (Chumbivilcas Province, Peru)

References

External links

 BBC: On This Day
 
 Historical Events on December 25

Days of the year
December